Karen Karls is an American politician. She is a member of the North Dakota House of Representatives from the 35th District, serving since 2006. She is a member of the Republican party.

Education 
Karl's has a Bachelor of Science degree in Medical technology from Minot State University.

Career 
Karl's is a wedding cake decorator.
In 2006, Karl's political career began as a Representative of North Dakota State Assembly.

References

Living people
Republican Party members of the North Dakota House of Representatives
21st-century American politicians
Women state legislators in North Dakota
Year of birth missing (living people)
Minot State University alumni
21st-century American women politicians